Jimmie Lou Fisher (December 31, 1941 – July 11, 2022) was an American politician who was the longest serving Arkansas State Treasurer in Arkansas history.

Early life and career 
Fisher was born in Delight, Arkansas on December 31, 1941, the eldest of the five children of Joyce Nutt Cooper and Tollie H. Cooper. Her father was a professional basketball player and school teacher and her mother was a high school basketball coach. During her childhood, the family relocated to five different towns in Greene and Faulkner counties when her father took a job as a school superintendent. She attended school at Delaplaine School in Delaplaine, Arkansas. She graduated from Vilonia High School, and attended Arkansas State College in Jonesboro, Arkansas. She started her public career as a worker for Arkansas Louisiana Gas Company. After working in a department store, an insurance firm and accounting firm she went to politics. Then she became an active member of the local Democratic Party. She was elected Treasurer of Greene County, Arkansas, in 1970, and went on to serve four two-year terms, until in 1979, when newly elected Governor Bill Clinton, appointed her Auditor of State.

Aside from that, she was very active in Democratic politics at the same time. She served as Vice Chairman of the Arkansas Democratic State Committee from 1976 to 1978 and went on to serve as a member of the Democratic National Committee during the same time period, 1976–1978. In 1978, she helped run then Arkansas Attorney General Bill Clinton's ultimately successful run for governor, serving as his 1st Congressional District Coordinator.

Other Democratic activism 
Fisher is noted as one of the major women in Arkansas politics, and one of the better known, and high-powered Arkansas Democratic activists. Positions she has held include:

Vice Chairman of Democratic State Committee, 1976–78, November 1991 – September 1993
Member of Democratic National Committee, 1976–78, and November 1991 – September 1993
Past President of the Arkansas Democratic Women's Club
Delegate to the Democratic National Convention, 1988, 1992, 1996, 2000
Member of the Credentials Committee, Democratic National Convention 1976

Tenure as state treasurer 
Jimmie Lou Fisher served as Auditor of State for one year. In 1980 she ran for state treasurer when Nancy Hall, the first woman ever elected as a statewide constitutional officer in Arkansas, retired after serving 18 years. Fisher easily won the primary due to her powerful connections within the Arkansas Democratic Party. She then went on to win the General Election just as easily, and in doing so, became only the third woman ever to be elected to statewide office in Arkansas (behind Hall and Senator Hattie Caraway). She then went on to win three two-year terms as state treasurer, and four four-year terms, serving a total of 22 years as state treasurer, making her the longest serving state treasurer in the history of Arkansas, and placing her among its longest serving statewide officials.

In 1987 she served as Vice President for the Southern Region of the National Association of State Auditors, Comptrollers and Treasurers. Later, in 1990, she served as President of the National Association of State Treasurers.

Fisher was a very active state treasurer. In 1995 she was a delegate to the White House Conference on Aging, and was later appointed to the Rural Telephone Commission by President Bill Clinton.

While Treasurer, Fisher served as a member of the board of Arkansas Development Finance Authority, the Arkansas Public Employees Retirement System Board, the Arkansas Teacher Retirement System Board, and was a member and Secretary of the Arkansas State Board of Finance.

2002 gubernatorial race 

In 2002 the Arkansas Democratic Party asked Fisher to be its candidate against Mike Huckabee, because they felt that she was the strongest candidate possible. They did not want to allow the highly popular Huckabee to blow past the opposition to another term as he had done in 1998, when he easily defeated the Democratic candidate in what was an embarrassingly large defeat for the Democratic Party. Determined not to let that happen again, the Democratic Party came to Fisher. Fisher was not able to run for another term for state treasurer because of the 1994 term-limits law that voters had passed. Because of this, Fisher reluctantly agreed to take on Huckabee. Despite her reluctance to enter the race originally, Fisher ran an incredibly strong and active campaign. She raised over $1 million, and campaigned hard across the state.

She hit Huckabee hard on Education with her REACH proposal. This came at a time where Huckabee was very vulnerable on that issue due to public frustration about poor education funding for rural schools. Other highlights of her campaign included: ethics accountability, prescription drug relief for seniors, Economic Growth and raising the minimum wage, crime, (during a time when Huckabee was being slammed due to questionable pardons, including one that left two women dead in Missouri), and fiscal responsibility.

Polling showed the race slowly narrowing, but Fisher was unable to cut into Huckabee's lead enough to win. Huckabee was also helped by the positive political wave for Republicans that swept through nation that year, though it did little to save incumbent U.S. Senator Tim Hutchinson, from his loss,  by a 54 percent to 46 percent margin, to then Attorney General Mark Pryor. In the end Fisher performed very well, far better than the Democrats' 1998 candidate. Fisher managed to hold the personally popular Mike Huckabee to a margin of victory of 53 percent to 47 percent, giving him a real race, which was just what the Democratic Party had hoped for when it pushed her into the race.

2006 Democratic Attorney General primary 
In 2006 Fisher signed on as Campaign Chairwoman for State Representative Dustin McDaniel of Jonesboro, who recently won an incredibly close race against North Little Rock City Attorney Paul Suskie for the Democratic nomination for Attorney General. This was thought by many political experts to be the biggest boost to McDaniel's campaign, even bigger than the endorsements of dozens of former presidents of the Arkansas State Bar Association, signifying Fisher's prominence among Democrats in the state.

2006 hospitalization 
Fisher was checked into St. Vincent Infirmary Medical Center in Little Rock on the morning of April 12, 2006. She apparently suffered a "mini-stroke" similar to one U.S. Senate Majority Leader Harry Reid had a few months before. She first noticed something odd while preparing breakfast that morning. She immediately called her sister, who drove her to a family doctor. He went on to send her straight the emergency room. Later it was determined that it was not progressing, and that she was stable. Those around her have said that she was positive as always, and appeared to be doing just fine. Doctors kept her in the hospital for almost a month and a half to keep her under observation, and perform tests. She was later released after she cleared all the tests, and they noted no further symptoms or complications.

Personal life
Fisher died at a hospital in Paragould, Arkansas on July 11, 2022, at the age of 80.

Awards 
Throughout her long career, Fisher has won many distinguished awards and honors, including:

Arkansas Democratic Party "Gressie Carnes Award" 1979
Worthen Bank Professional Women's Advisory Board "Arkansas Professional Women of Distinction Award" 1989
George C. Douthit "Freedom of Information Award" 1989
National Association of State Treasurers "Jesse Unruh Award" 1991
National Association of Democratic Women "Outstanding Elected Democratic Women Holding Public Office Award" 1992
Arkansas Federation of Democratic Women "Nancy J. Hall Award" 1995
Arkansas Easter Seal
"Arkansan of the Year" 1997
"Top 100 Women in Arkansas" 1997, 1998, 1999
UALR "Women of Arkansas – Agent of Change Award", 2000
Association of Government Accountants  "Financial Manager of the Year" 2000

Election history 
2002 General Election

References

External links 
http://www.jimmieloufisher.com/

|-

|-

1941 births
2022 deaths
20th-century American women politicians
20th-century American politicians
21st-century American women politicians
Arkansas Democrats
Arkansas State University alumni
Candidates in the 2002 United States elections
People from Greene County, Arkansas
People from Paragould, Arkansas
Place of death missing
State Auditors of Arkansas
State treasurers of Arkansas
Women in Arkansas politics
21st-century American politicians